Jeffrey Eric Moore (born 15 January 1980 in Gloucester Township, New Jersey) is an American retired soccer player. After his playing career, Moore worked for six seasons as an assistant coach for his alma mater, Stockton University.

Raised in Gloucester Township, New Jersey, Moore played prep soccer at Triton Regional High School.

References

External links
 Stockton Athletics Hall of Fame page

Living people
American soccer players
Association football midfielders
1980 births
New York Red Bulls players
Major League Soccer players
Soccer players from New Jersey
Sportspeople from Camden County, New Jersey
People from Gloucester Township, New Jersey
Triton Regional High School (New Jersey) alumni
Virginia Beach Mariners players
A-League (1995–2004) players
Stockton Ospreys men's soccer players
College men's soccer coaches in the United States
Major Indoor Soccer League (2001–2008) players
Philadelphia KiXX (2001–2008 MISL) players